Joseph Bernard (1866–1931) was a modern classical French sculptor.

Joseph Bernard may also refer to:

Joseph Bernard (actor) (1923–2006), American actor
Joseph E. Bernard (1880–1958), American character actor
Joseph Alphonsus Bernard (1881–1962), Canadian politician
Joseph Karl Bernard, Austrian journalist and librettist
Joe Bernard (1882–1960), American baseball player
Joe Bernard (American football) (born 1963), American college football coach

See also
Hans Zatzka (1859–1945), Austrian painter who used the pseudonym 'Joseph Bernard'
Joseph D. Bernard House, Rayne, Louisiana